Euryphura plautilla, or Hewitson's commander, is a butterfly in the family Nymphalidae. It is found in Nigeria, Cameroon, Gabon, the Republic of the Congo, the Central African Republic, the Democratic Republic of the Congo and western Uganda. The habitat consists of forests.

References

Butterflies described in 1865
Limenitidinae
Butterflies of Africa
Taxa named by William Chapman Hewitson